Kopin may refer to:

Kopin Corporation, United States electronics manufacturer
Kopin, Myaung, village in Myaung Township, Sagaing District, Sagaing Division, Myanmar
Mascot of the Luminous Arc video game series
Fictional currency in the Groo the Wanderer American comic book series

People with the surname Kopin or Kopins include:
Irwin Kopin (1929–2017), American biochemist
Karen Kopins (born 1961), American actress
Roman Kopin (born 1974), governor of Chukotka, Russia

People with the given name Kopin include:
Kopin Liu (born 1949), Taiwanese physical chemist